Jammu and Kashmir has many lakes, rivers, and glaciers. Significant rivers that flow through Jammu & Kashmir from the Himalayas are Jhelum, Chenab and Ravi These river basins are located at a higher elevation facilitating huge hydro power potential. Major lakes include Manasbal Lake, Dal Lake, Wular Lake, Nageen Lake. There are around 1230 water bodies in Jammu & Kashmir.

List of rivers

The major rivers in Jammu and Kashmir are :
Brengi River or Bringhi River
Chenab River
Dudhganga - is a tributary of the Jhelum that flows from Ludurmarg and rises in the central Pir Panjal range near Tatakooti Peak. Two mountain streams, the Sangesafed and the Yachera, form this river. This river flows through Batmalu Swamp near Srinagar.
Jhelum River
Lidder River
Markha River
Nala Palkhu
Kishanganga River
Poonch River
Rambi Ara
Ravi River
Sandran River
Sind River
Tawi River
Ujh River
Veshaw River
Yapola River
Neeru river
Marusudar River

See also
Rivers of India

References